Solar power in Somalia is, in 2012, being considered for development in the near future. Two items that are being made available in seven other African countries in the "Light Years Ahead" program that are being considered are solar lanterns and solar street lights. India has a very successful solar lamp program. A solar lamp costs about the same as a few months of kerosene for a kerosene lamp, and provides many years of light.

Most of the energy in Somalia is from charcoal and wood, and 90% of the country does not have access to electricity.

See also
Deployment of solar power to energy grids
List of renewable energy topics by country

References

External links
Energy Profile of Somalia
Somalia : Energy Profile